Samuel Woodbridge may refer to:

 Samuel Merrill Woodbridge (1819–1905), American clergyman, theologian, author and college professor
 Samuel Isett Woodbridge (1856–1926), American Presbyterian missionary to China